Crying in H Mart: A Memoir is a 2021 memoir by Michelle Zauner, singer and guitarist of the musical project Japanese Breakfast. It is her debut book, published on April 20, 2021, by Alfred A. Knopf. It is an expansion of Zauner's essay of the same name which was published in The New Yorker on August 20, 2018. The title mentions H Mart, a North-American supermarket chain that specializes in Korean and Asian products.

The memoir received critical acclaim and debuted at number two on The New York Times best-seller list for combined print and e-book nonfiction. It spent 50 weeks on the combined list, and 60 weeks on the hardcover nonfiction list.

Background 
After Zauner's mother Chongmi died of pancreatic cancer in October 2014, Zauner frequently made trips to H Mart, an experience she chronicled in her New Yorker essay and in "Real Life: Love, Loss and Kimchi" which won Glamour Magazine's 11th essay contest.

Zauner has said that she decided to write a book-length memoir after literary agents contacted her following the publication of her New Yorker essay. In February 2019, American publishing house Alfred A. Knopf announced that it had won the rights to the book at auction.

Summary 
The book begins with the titular essay in which Zauner talks about buying ingredients for Korean cuisine at H Mart. Zauner reminisces about her mother, Chongmi, calling her strict but loving. Zauner writes that she wanted more family approval yet frequently disobeyed her parents and was considered rebellious.

Every two years, Zauner and Chongmi travel to Seoul to visit their family. When Zauner is 14, her maternal grandmother dies, leaving Zauner haunted by her last words.

During high school, Zauner falls into depression, resulting in truancy. Chongmi allows her to sleep once a week at her best friend's house, where she begins to admire her friend's mother, engendering Chongmi's jealousy and straining their relationship. Zauner is inspired to learn guitar after watching a DVD of the Yeah Yeah Yeahs and Karen O, who is also of Korean American heritage. Zauner begins to write songs and perform in public, including opening for Maria Taylor at the W.O.W. Hall. Zauner applies to liberal arts universities for women and attends Bryn Mawr College in Pennsylvania, to Chongmi's disappointment.

In 2014, Zauner graduated college with a creative writing degree and leads a band named Little Big League. However, the band struggles to find commercial success. That summer, Zauner learns that Chongmi has cancer and flies to Eugene to care for her. Soon after Chongmi returns home, her friend Kye arrives and begins to take care of her.

In August, Zauner returns to Philadelphia to tour with Little Big League. After the tour, her father Joel reveals that Chongmi's condition is worsening. The three fly to Seoul as per Chongmi's wishes but she is hospitalized upon arrival. After Chongmi recovers, Zauner and Joel transfer her to Riverbend Hospital in Eugene.

Wanting her mother to attend her wedding, Zauner proposes marriage to her boyfriend Peter, who accepts. Soon after, Zauner and Peter get married with their families and friends attending. After the wedding, Kye leaves after being irritated by Joel. Soon after, Chongmi's condition declines drastically and she dies on October 18, 2014. Joel, Zauner, and Peter host a funeral the next week. Joel and Zauner fly to Vietnam, hoping to soothe their grief but the trip only strains their relationship.

After moving to Brooklyn with Peter, Zauner begins learning to cook Korean cuisine and records music to cope with her grief. She begins working at an advertising firm in New York City, deciding that she will soon quit recording music due to her lack of success.

Zauner submits an album to Yellow K Records as Japanese Breakfast, titling it Psychopomp. Its reception exceeds Zauner's expectations and Japanese Breakfast signs with the record label Dead Oceans. The band tours to promote the album and Zauner quits her advertising job.

During the band's last tour date in Asia, Zauner's maternal aunt Nami and her husband, whom Zauner nicknamed "Boo", are in attendance. After the concert ends, Zauner and Peter spend time with Nami and Boo. On the night before they depart, Zauner and Peter accompany Nami and Boo to a karaoke bar where Nami asks Zauner to sing "Coffee Hanjan". As the lyrics begin, Zauner hopes that her heritage will help her sing the words.

Reception 
The book debuted at number two on The New York Times best-seller list for combined print and e-book nonfiction for the week ending April 24, 2021. As of September 2022, the book has spent 50 weeks on the list, and 60 weeks on the hardcover nonfiction best-seller list. The book has 30 "rave" reviews and five "positive" reviews, according to review aggregator website Book Marks.

Publishers Weekly wrote, "The prose is lyrical if at times overwrought, but Zauner does a good job capturing the grief of losing a parent with pathos."

Kristen Martin of NPR called the book a "rare acknowledgement of the ravages of cancer in a culture obsessed with seeing it as an enemy that can be battled with hope and strength."

In The Atlantic, food writer Mayukh Sen wrote, "As lovely as Zauner's indulgent sketches of meals are, they slow her momentum...But agile writers know how to mine food for emotional truth, and Zauner finds her footing as Crying in H Mart progresses. Near the end, she connects food to her own unmooring."

The book received the Goodreads Choice Award for Memoir & Autobiography.

Film adaptation 
On June 7, 2021, it was announced that Crying in H Mart: A Memoir would be adapted as a feature film by Orion Pictures. Zauner will adapt the film and provide the film's soundtrack, as Japanese Breakfast. In May 2022, Zauner announced that she had finished the first draft of the screenplay.

Will Sharpe was announced as the director of the film adaptation in March 2023.

References 

2021 non-fiction books
American memoirs
Korean-American literature
Debut books
Music autobiographies
Books about cancer
Books about death
Books about food and drink
Alfred A. Knopf books